Buloloa is a genus of tephritid (fruit flies) in the family Tephritidae. The genus was named by Hardy in 1986.

Species
Buloloa spinicosta

References

Phytalmiinae
Tephritidae genera